Amund Svensson, born 21 April 1978, is a Norwegian musician and composer.

He is the co-founder and the main composer of the band The Kovenant, for which he plays guitars and keyboards as well as write orchestrations. He is also involved in his own long abandoned side project Painstation, and has created remixes and orchestrations for Theatre of Tragedy, Mortiis and Deathstars.

References

1978 births
Living people
Norwegian black metal musicians
Norwegian multi-instrumentalists
Musicians from Hamar
Place of birth missing (living people)
Norwegian people of Swedish descent
The Kovenant members